Actress Lisa Rinna is the host of Oxygen Network's Tease, airing since 2007. Known to television audiences from her starring roles on Dancing with the Stars, Soap Talk, Melrose Place and Days of Our Lives, Emmy-nominated Rinna is also recognizable for her signature layered hairstyle. Each Tease episode features two up-and-coming hair stylists as they face-off in an exciting Olympics-style tournament.

The aspiring stylists put their skills to the tress test in front of a panel of expert judges: hairstylist Peter Ishkhans, model Roshumba Williams and agent Frank Moore. The aspiring stylists compete for a chance at the supreme challenge – a one-on-one battle with one of three high-profile master stylists, Clyde Haygood, Stephanie Hobgood and Kim Vo. Should the aspiring stylist surpass the expertise of a hair pro, his or her photo is hung on the Tease hair wall of fame and he or she receives the "silver scissors", the crowning symbol of a styling victory.

Each episode includes a themed timed challenge designed to push the stylists' skills to the limit. The challenges in the 2007 season include:

Ep#1       Celeb Look-alike
Ep#2       Long to Short
Ep#3       Blondes Have More Fun
Ep#4       Identical Twins
Ep#5       Rock n' Roll Hair
Ep#6       Avant Garde

Tease is executive produced by Michael Yudin for MY Entertainment (King of Vegas, and Pros vs. Joes) and J. Brian Gadinsky for G Group (American Idol Season One, American Gladiators, and America's Most Wanted).

Link
Official Website (via Internet Archive)

2007 American television series debuts
2007 American television series endings
2000s American reality television series
Oxygen (TV channel) original programming
Fashion-themed reality television series